The Nationwide Group Staff Union (NGSU) is an independent trade union in the United Kingdom. It has a membership of over 12,000 and represents workers within the Nationwide Building Society and its associated companies.

The NGSU was formed in 1990 by the merger of Anglia Building Society Staff Association and Nationwide Building Society Staff Association.  The Portman Group Staff Association (PGSA) transferred engagements to NGSU in 2008. It is affiliated to the Trades Union Congress.

The union absorbed the Staff Union Dunfermline Building Society on 1 January 2011, and One Union of Regional Staff on 1 September.

External links

 Nationwide Group Staff Union

References

Financial services companies established in 1990
Trade unions in the United Kingdom
1990 establishments in the United Kingdom
Trade unions established in 1990
Finance sector trade unions
Trade unions based in Oxfordshire
Trade unions affiliated with the Trades Union Congress